"Holland, 1945" is a song by American indie rock group Neutral Milk Hotel. It was released as the only single from the band's second and final studio album In the Aeroplane Over the Sea in October 1998. "Holland, 1945" is one of the album's louder, more upbeat songs, featuring overdriven and distorted guitars. The song also showcases fuzz noise on all of the instruments, a quality created by producer Robert Schneider.

"Holland, 1945" was one of the last songs Neutral Milk Hotel frontman Jeff Mangum wrote for In the Aeroplane Over the Sea. It remained untitled until art director Chris Bilheimer asked Mangum what to title the song in the liner notes; when Mangum told him to use either "Holland" or "1945", Bilheimer suggested combining the two.

Single release
The single version of "Holland, 1945" was released in October 1998 on the Blue Rose Record Company label. It was the second single released by the band, and was the band's last official release before a decade-long hiatus and their subsequent reunion in 2011. Orange Twin Records released some un-numbered versions through its website. A rare promo CD was released on October 19, 1998.

The single contains the b-side track "Engine", which was recorded live in Piccadilly Circus tube station.

In 2011, the single was re-issued as a 7" picture disc with a fold-out poster and a different live version of "Engine".

Interpretations
The song contains references to Anne Frank. In 1945, World War II ended and Anne and her sister Margot died of typhus. The lyric "all when I'd want to keep white roses in their eyes" could be seen as a reference to the White Rose resistance group that existed in Nazi Germany in the early 1940s, though songwriter Jeff Mangum claims that he had never heard of the movement before In the Aeroplane Over the Sea was released.

Also referenced in the song is a "dark brother wrapped in white". In the liner notes for the song, Mangum initialed the letters "(h.p.)" after the words "your dark brother". A critic for The Boston Phoenix wrote in 1998 that this "dark brother" was someone who committed suicide, a family member of one of Mangum's close friends.

Legacy

In 2010 Pitchfork included the song at number 7 on their list of the 
"Top 200 Tracks of the 1990s".

"Holland, 1945" is played during the closing credits of the final episode of The Colbert Report. Slate speculated the song was chosen to pay tribute to host Stephen Colbert's father James William Colbert Jr. and older brothers Peter and Paul, who were killed in the crash of Eastern Air Lines Flight 212, when he was 10 years old. Colbert's emotional connection to the song was noted in an article by Maureen Dowd in The New York Times in 2014.

Personnel
Credits adapted from the single's liner notes.

Neutral Milk Hotel
Jeff Mangum vocals, guitar, bowed fuzz bass, cover design
Jeremy Barnes drums, organ
Scott Spillane trumpet, euphonium
Julian Koster singing saw, bass

Additional musicians
Rick Benjamin trombone
Marisa Bissinger saxophone
Michelle Anderson Uilleann pipes

Technical personnel
Robert Schneider producer on "Holland, 1945"
Laura Carter cover design, producer on "Engine" (1998 release)
Isaac McCalla mastering on "Holland, 1945"

Notes

References

Neutral Milk Hotel songs
1998 singles
1997 songs